Şəmsabad (also, Shamsabad) is a village and municipality in the Agdash Rayon of Azerbaijan. It has a population of 1,604. The municipality consists of the villages of Şəmsabad, Əmirməhmud, and Qaraqan Saatlı.

References 

Populated places in Agdash District